"Hell Yeah" is a song by American R&B singer Ginuwine featuring rapper Baby. It was written, produced, and arranged by R. Kelly for his fourth studio album The Senior (2003). Released as the album's lead single, the song became a top 20 hit in the United States, peaking at number seventeen on the US Billboard Hot 100, and reached the top thirty in the United Kingdom. The official remix features Baby and Clipse along with Kelly and Clipse. A music video for "Hell Yeah" was shot in Las Vegas and includes a cameo by rapper Snoop Dogg and comedian DeRay Davis.

Track listing

Credits and personnel
Credits lifted from the liner notes of The Senior.

Baby – vocals, writer
Ginuwine – executive producer, vocals
David McPherson – co-executive producer

R. Kelly – arranger, producer, writer
Jerry Vines – co-executive producer

Charts

Weekly charts

Year-end charts

Release history

References
	

	

2003 singles
Birdman (rapper) songs
Ginuwine songs
Songs written by R. Kelly
Song recordings produced by R. Kelly
Songs written by Birdman (rapper)